The Zeppelin-Staaken E-4/20 was a revolutionary four-engine all-metal passenger monoplane designed in 1917 by Adolf Rohrbach and completed in 1919 at the Zeppelin-Staaken works outside Berlin, Germany. The E-4/20 was the first four-engine, all-metal stressed skin heavier-than-air airliner built.

Design and development
At a time when most aircraft were small, single-engine biplanes made of wood and canvas, the E-4 was a large (102-foot wingspan), all-metal, four-engine, stress-skinned, semi-monocoque, cantilevered-wing monoplane, with an enclosed cockpit, and accommodation for 18 passengers plus a crew of five, including two pilots, a radio operator, an engineer and a steward, as well as radio-telegraph communications, a toilet, a galley and separate baggage and mail storage.

The E-4 included numerous innovations, including its all-metal monocoque construction, onboard facilities such as lavatory, kitchen and radio communications, and its notable and sturdy monoplane load-bearing box-girder wing constructed of dural metal which formed both the wing's main girder and the structure of the wing itself.  Skinned with thin sheets of dural metal to give the aerofoil shape necessary for a wing, the girder section wing had fabric covered leading and trailing edges attached to it. This superb and innovative wing was robust and self-supporting.

The E-4 was completed in 1919 and test flown between 30 September 1920 and 1922 when it was broken up on the orders of the Inter-Allied Commission.

Background
The Zeppelin-Staaken E-4/20 was a product of the innovative Zeppelin Airship company. Count Ferdinand von Zeppelin, founder of the Luftschiffbau Zeppelin GmbH (Zeppelin Airship Construction Co.) was himself a major aeronautical innovator, creator of the groundbreaking giant aluminium alloy framed Zeppelin lighter than air dirigible airships and later developer of a series of R-Planes.

Zeppelin was one of the first aeronautical pioneers to apply stringent scientific principles to the design of aircraft, focusing on issues like power-to-weight ratios of engines and using the then new metal alloy aluminium for structural components. Zeppelin heard of the success in Russia of Igor Sikorsky's pioneering 4-engined Le Grand and Ilya Muromets aircraft. From the outbreak of war in 1914 the 4-engined Ilya Muromets class of aircraft were used as heavy bombers. The German government saw the potential for large strategic bombers and issued a design standard which was used by several manufacturers to produce Riesenflugzeuge ("Giant Aircraft") or R-Planes. The most successful design and manufacturing company of R-Planes was Zeppelin which was also the only company to manufacture them in series production, the R-VI.

Legacy
Adolf Rohrbach went on to found his own aircraft company, Rohrbach Metall-Flugzeugbau where he designed and built a number of innovative civil all-metal airliners, such as the Ro-VIII trimotor as well as some groundbreaking flying boats.

The Smithsonian Institution's "Airspace Magazine" suggested that Rohrbach could have been Germany's Boeing or Douglas but that the Inter-Allied Commission deemed the E-4/20 too much of a threat as a potential bomber to be allowed to go into serial production and ordered its destruction, even declining offers to sell it to allied countries.

The 1932 Armstrong Whitworth Atalanta used a very similar configuration, differing in construction details and more powerful engines.

Specifications

References

External links

Smithsonian photo

Zeppelin-Staaken
1910s German airliners
Four-engined tractor aircraft
Four-engined piston aircraft
Aircraft first flown in 1920